Paul Alexander Black (born 30 October 1977 in Aberdeen) is a Scottish former footballer who was once a player with Dundee United in the Scottish Premier Division.

Career
Black signed professional terms in 1994 and was given his debut in 1996–97, in the final day 3–0 defeat at Celtic, coming on as a 77th-minute substitute. Black was released that summer and moved to Huntly, where – as a full-back – he won the resulting Highland Football League title. Black stayed with Huntly before retiring due to injury.

References

External links

1977 births
Footballers from Aberdeen
Living people
Scottish footballers
Dundee United F.C. players
Huntly F.C. players
Scottish Football League players
Highland Football League players
Association football midfielders